Richard Smart may refer to:
Richard Smart (viticulturalist) (born 1945), Australian viticulturalist and consultant on viticulture methods
Richard Smart (actor) (1913–1992), Broadway actor and rancher
Richard Smart (gentleman) (died 1560), English landowner, twice a Member of Parliament for Ipswich